Turiscai is a village in the Turiscai administrative post, Manufahi municipality of East Timor. Turiskai in Mambai language means "Turibaum".

References

Populated places in East Timor
Manufahi Municipality